Richard Goodwin Capen Jr. (born July 16, 1934) is an American businessman and former United States Ambassador to Spain from 1992 to 1993.

Biography 
Capen was born in Hartford, Connecticut on July 16, 1934. He graduated from Columbia College in 1956 on a Naval Reserve Officers Training Corps scholarship and served in the U.S. Navy after college from 1956 to 1959. He served as the Principal Deputy Assistant Secretary for Public Affairs and the Assistant Secretary of Defense for Legislative Affairs from 1970 to 1971 responding to Secretary of Defense Melvin Laird. He is a recipient of the Defense Distinguished Service Medal in 1971.

Before being nominated for ambassadorship, he was vice chairman of the second largest domestic newspaper publisher Knight Ridder from 1989 to 1991 and chairman and publisher of The Miami Herald from 1983 to 1989. Under Capen's stewardship, the newspaper won five Pulitzer Prizes. He also served as the vice president of Copley Newspapers.

In 1984, he received the John Jay Award from Columbia College for distinguished professional achievement, along with college alumni, conductor Emerson Buckley, ambassador Luis J. Lauredo, and dean of Leonard M. Miller School of Medicine Emanuel Papper.

Capen served on the board of Carnival Corporation & plc for 16 years before stepping down in 2010.

Capen has been a long-time resident of La Jolla, California and has been a contributor to The San Diego Union-Tribune.

References 

1934 births
Living people
Columbia College (New York) alumni
21st-century American businesspeople
Ambassadors of the United States to Spain
Knight Ridder
Miami Herald people
20th-century American newspaper publishers (people)
Recipients of the Defense Distinguished Service Medal
20th-century American diplomats
Carnival Corporation & plc people
United States Navy sailors
People from La Jolla, San Diego
The San Diego Union-Tribune people